Adolf Brunner may refer to:

Adolf Brunner (composer) (1901–1992), Swiss composer 
 (1900–1963), List of mayors of Herisau
Adolf Brunner, also Adolph Brunner (1837–1909), Swiss architect, architect of orangery in the Rieterpark